No. 315 (City of Dęblin) Polish Fighter Squadron  was one of several Polish squadrons in the Royal Air Force (RAF) during the Second World War. It was formed as part of an agreement between the Polish Government in Exile and the United Kingdom in 1941.  It was named after the city of Dęblin, where the main Polish Air Force Academy has been located since 1927.

History

The squadron was formed at RAF Acklington, England, on 21 January 1941.  The squadron, equipped with Hurricanes, was moved in March to RAF Speke, Liverpool, where it made frequent patrols over naval convoys as part of No. 9 Group RAF.  Before July, when it came under Polish command. No 315 was commanded by Squadron Leader H. D. Cooke.

In July it was moved to RAF Northolt, West London, re-equipped with Spitfires and began to conduct offensive fighter sweeps over occupied Europe. During two operations over France, on 9 August, the squadron achieved its first aircraft claims—two Bf 109s destroyed, three probables and three damaged. The squadron returned to Lancashire in April 1942, located at RAF Woodvale, Sefton. The squadron returned to Northolt in September and resumed operations over France. In June 1943, the squadron was withdrawn to Yorkshire, then to County Down, Northern Ireland in July.

Having returned to England in November, the squadron moved to the south west in April 1944, where it joined No. 133 Wing RAF of the 2nd Tactical Air Force. The squadron was re-equipped with the Mustang Mk III, which the squadron used for the remainder of the war. The squadron formed part of southern England's defence against the V-1 flying bombs and served in the Battle of Normandy.

During a sweep over France on 18 August, 12 Mustangs of No. 315 engaged 60 German fighters of JG2 and JG26, which was in the process of taking off and landing near Beauvais, France. In the ensuing battle, the squadron was credited with 16 victories, 1 probable and 3 damaged for the loss of one pilot, Squadron Leader Eugeniusz Horbaczewski. Conversely, German claims were that 12 aircraft had been lost and that they had themselves shot down 6 aircraft (one of which was claimed to be a Lockheed P-38 Lightning).

The squadron later carried out operations over Germany, Norway and the Netherlands, where the squadron carried out sorties until the end of the war. The squadron claimed 86.33 confirmed victories, 18 probable and 26 damaged. After the war, 315 Squadron remained part of RAF Fighter Command until it was disbanded on 14 January 1947.

Commanding officers

Aircraft operated

Notable pilots
 Eugeniusz Malczewski
 Francis S. Gabreski
 Janusz Zurakowski
 Eugeniusz Horbaczewski
 Brunon Semmerling

See also
 Air Force of the Polish Army
 List of Royal Air Force aircraft squadrons
 Polish Air Forces
 Polish Air Forces in Great Britain
 Polish contribution to World War II

References

Citations

Bibliography

 Halley, James J. The Squadrons of the Royal Air Force & Commonwealth, 1918–1988. Tonbridge, Kent, UK: Air Britain (Historians), 1988. .
 Jefford, C.G. RAF Squadrons, a Comprehensive Record of the Movement and Equipment of all RAF Squadrons and their Antecedents since 1912. Shrewsbury, Shropshire, UK: Airlife Publishing, 2001. .
 Matusiak, Wojtek with Robert Gretzyngier and Piotr Wiśniewski. 315 Squadron. Sandomierz, Poland/Redbourn, UK: Mushroom Model publications, 2004. .
 Rawlings, John D.R. Fighter Squadrons of the RAF and their Aircraft. London: Macdonald & Jane's (Publishers), 1969 (revised edition 1976, reprinted 1978). .

External links

External links last verified on 14 January 2006
 Brief history of No. 315 Squadron (Official RAF site)
  A history of No. 315 Squadron by Wilhelm Ratuszynski
 Movement of No. 315 Squadron
 Photo Gallery of 315 Squadron
 Nos. 300–318 Squadron Histories on RAFweb
 Personnel of the Polish Air Force in Great Britain 1940-1947

315
315
315
315
315